Elizabeth Barry (1658 – 7 November 1713) was an English actress of the Restoration period.

Elizabeth Barry's biggest influence on Restoration drama was her presentation of performing as the tragic actress. She worked in large, prestigious London theatre companies throughout her successful career: from 1675 in the Duke's Company, 1682 – 1695 in the monopoly United Company, and from 1695 onwards as a member of the actors' cooperative usually known as Betterton's Company, of which she was one of the original shareholders. Her stage career began 15 years after the first-ever professional actresses had replaced Shakespeare's boy heroines on the London stage.

The actor Thomas Betterton said that her acting gave "success to plays that would disgust the most patient reader", and the critic and playwright John Dennis described her as "that incomparable Actress changing like Nature which she represents, from Passion to Passion, from Extream to Extream, with piercing Force and with easy Grace".

Early career
Barry's first performance was at the age of 17 in Thomas Otway's Alcibiades. Her performance was so poor that she was fired from the Duke's Company. She then met John Wilmot, 2nd Earl of Rochester. Their relationship grew from professional colleagues to lovers. They had one child named Elizabeth, who was born in 1677 and died in 1689.

Barry drew on her relationship with Rochester for many of her sexual performances. While multiple sources confirm that Rochester was Barry's lover, the only source for the coaching story is a Life of Barry published in 1741 – 65 years after the events – by Edmund Curll, well known for his fanciful and inaccurate biographies.

Barry was a successful comedian who created a variety of Restoration comedy heroines throughout her career, but her greatest impact on Restoration drama was as a tragic actress. Her capacity for projecting pathos was an inspiration to playwrights Thomas Otway and Thomas Southerne in the three famous tragic roles they wrote for her: Monimia in Otway's The Orphan (1680), Belvidera in Otway's Venice Preserved (1682), and Isabella in Southerne's The Fatal Marriage (1694). These three roles, wrote the prompter John Downes, "gain'd her the Name of Famous Mrs. Barry, both at Court and City, for whenever She Acted any of these three Parts, she forc'd Tears from the Eyes of her Auditory, especially those who have any Sense of Pity for the Distress't." 

In his autobiography, many years later, Colley Cibber recalled the power of her voice: "When distress of Tenderness possess'd her, she subsided into the most affecting Melody and Softness. In the Art of exciting Pity, she had a Power beyond all the Actresses I have yet seen, or what your Imagination can conceive."  Elizabeth Howe has argued that it was Barry's success in the role of Monimia that "clinched the movement away from heroic drama and started the establishment of 'she-tragedy' as a popular genre." Also known as pathetic tragedy, innocent women were represented as sexual objects and as victims of male lust.

Barry was always described as being a plain woman. Portraits suggest intelligence but heavy features and the playwright Thomas Shadwell writes in a letter in 1692 that it would have been better to have staged Nicholas Brady's The Rape in Roman dress, "and then w'th a Mantle to have covered her hips Mrs Barry would have acted ye part." Apparently, none of this mattered to contemporaries. Even though Barry was "the ugliest Woman" in the world off stage, wrote an anonymous author in A Comparison Between the Two Stages (1702), she was "the finest Woman in the World upon the Stage."

Barry's acting style was embedded in the influences from her own personality and life. Elizabeth as a person was seen to be beautiful and virtuous. Although many of the characters she played were virgins, it was known about her relationship with Rochester. It has also been known that she channeled her sexual relationship with Rochester through many of her performances. Also during this time, it was seen that Barry's body had metaphorical meaning to the description of her character. When Barry starred in The Orphan, it was implied that "the trope of the female breast to represent innocence or ruin (consider the many references to Monimia’s "swelling breasts" or "white breasts"). Thus Otway uses the dismemberment of the female body, expressed through the "mangled breasts besmeared with blood", to signify the ruin of the state".

Later career
Later into Barry’s career, she was given more roles of a motherhood figure than a sexual object. Barry worked for the Duke's Company from 1675 to 1682, taking the role of Cordelia opposite Thomas Betterton's Lear in Nahum Tate's 1681 adaptation of Shakespeare's King Lear. After the Duke's and the King's companies were amalgamated in 1682, she continued as one of the star performers of the new United Company, which remained for 12 years the only theatrical company in London. The absence of rival companies left the actors in a weak bargaining position in relation to management.

One year after her performance in The Fatal Marriage, Barry decided to leave the United Company due to a salary dispute in 1695. She then proceeded to work for a new company with actor Thomas Betterton and actress Anne Bracegirdle. Barry was one of the original patent-holders of the actors' company, which opened at Lincoln's Inn Fields with the smash hit of William Congreve's Love For Love in 1695 and continued to successfully challenge Rich's United Company.There was a huge wage gap between men and woman performers as Betterton was paid £4 and 20s per week and Barry received only £2 and 10s shillings.

Barry officially retired from the stage in 1710 at 52 years old; her acting career lasted a total of 35 years. Her retirement fell short as she died three years later at the age of 55 due to a fever.

Selected list of plays and roles

Fictional portrayals
Barry is a supporting character in The Libertine, Stephen Jeffreys' play about John Wilmot's life, as well as its 2004 film adaptation, in which she is portrayed by Samantha Morton. Barry also appears as a character in the 2015 play [exit Mrs Behn] or, The Leo Play by Christopher vanDer Ark.

Notes

References

Cibber, Colley (first published 1740, Everyman's Library ed. 1976). An Apology for the Life of Colley Cibber. London: J. M. Dent & Sons Ltd.
Drougge, Helga. "Love, Death, and Mrs. Barry in Thomas Southerne’s Plays". Comparative Drama, vol. 27, no. 4, 1994, pp. 408–425. 
Hamilton, Kate. "The 'Famous Mrs. Barry': Elizabeth Barry and Restoration Celebrity". Studies in Eighteenth-Century Culture, vol. 42, 2013, pp. 291-320.
Highfill, Philip Jr, Burnim, Kalman A., and Langhans, Edward (1973–93). Biographical Dictionary of Actors, Actresses, Musicians, Dancers, Managers and Other Stage Personnel in London, 1660–1800. 16 volumes. Carbondale: Southern Illinois University Press.
Howe, Elizabeth (1992). The First English Actresses: Women and Drama 1660–1700. Cambridge: Cambridge University Press.
Hume, Robert. "Elizabeth Barry’s First Roles and the Cast of "The Man of Mode". Theatre History Studies, vol. 5, 1 Jan. 1985.
Milhous, Judith (1979). Thomas Betterton and the Management of Lincoln's Inn Fields 1695–1708. Carbondale, Illinois: Southern Illinois University Press.
Hartley, Jimmy(2014), The Dramatic Life of Elizabeth Barry. London: Amazon.
Milling, J. et al. (eds) The Cambridge History of British Theatre 1660 to 1895, Vol. 2, Cambridge, Short Run Press, p. 78.
 Joseph Donohue (ed.) (2004), The Cambridge History of British Theatre, Vol. 2: 1660 to 1895

External links

1658 births
1713 deaths
English stage actresses
17th-century English actresses
18th-century English actresses